Tim Barhorst is an American politician. He serves as a Republican member for the 85th district of the Ohio House of Representatives.

Life and career 
Barhorst attended Wright State University.

In August 2022, Barhorst defeated Lilli Johnson Vitale and Rochiel Foulk in the Republican primary election for the 85th district of the Ohio House of Representatives. No candidate was nominated to challenge him in the general election. He succeeded Nino Vitale. He assumed office in 2023.

References 

Living people
Year of birth missing (living people)
Place of birth missing (living people)
Republican Party members of the Ohio House of Representatives
21st-century American politicians
Wright State University alumni